Stephen John Baxter  (born 1 October 1965) is a Northern Irish football manager and retired footballer. He is the current manager of Crusaders, where he had two spells as a player, and is currently the longest serving manager of one club in world football.

In 2019, Baxter was awarded a British Empire Medal for services to football in Northern Ireland.

Playing career
'Stanley' (as he would later be nicknamed after the Scottish comedian) started out as a player with Glentoran before signing for Ards in 1985. His goalscoring exploits caught the notice of Linfield and he signed for them in 1987, winning two Irish League championships, three Gold Cups and a League Cup. He scored 102 goals in 219 games for the Blues, of which 169 were starts.

Unable to hold down a regular starting place, however, he signed for Crusaders in 1994. Baxter became one of the key players of Crusaders' golden team of the 90's, again winning two Irish League championships, a Gold Cup and League Cup. In 1995/96, he was named in the Football Writers' Premier League Team of the Year, and in 1996/97 he was named as the Ulster Footballer of the Year. He then moved to Glenavon for a successful period before returning to Seaview for a second two-year spell in 2000.

Baxter was memorable for his hat-trick in a relegation play-off against Lisburn Distillery, ensuring the Crues' survival. Baxter left Seaview a firm fan-favourite and legend status for a short spell at Bangor, where he coached briefly and played two cup games, before retiring from football completely and opening a sports shop in Newtownards. He played a total of 650 games in his career, and scored 303 goals. He later came out of retirement briefly in a County Antrim Shield match against Dundela in 2005.

Managerial career
Following the sacking of Alan Dornan, Baxter was installed as manager at Seaview, yet was unable to keep the Hatchetmen in the top division. After winning virtually every intermediate trophy in sight the following season, under Baxter's leadership the Crues returned to the Irish League and lead the table briefly, before finishing in 6th position in 2006–07.

After, he led the club to their first top 3 finish for a decade in 2008–09, and also the team's first Irish Cup victory in 41 years. He led the club to County Antrim Shield success the following season. Baxter is the club's most successful manager of all time.

In 2011–12, Baxter led the Crues to triumph in the Irish League Cup, winning the competition for the first time since 1996. That same season, he delivered success at the 2012 Setanta Sports Cup.

Managerial statistics

Honours

As a player
Linfield
Irish League (2): 1988–89, 1992–93
Gold Cup (3): 1987–88, 1988–89, 1989–90
Irish League Cup (1): 1991–92

Lisburn Distillery
Gold Cup (1): 1993–94

Crusaders
Irish League (2): 1994–95, 1996–97
Gold Cup (1): 1995–96
Irish League Cup (1): 1996–97

Glenavon
Mid-Ulster Cup (1): 1998–99

Individual
NI Football Writers' Premier League Team of the Year: 1995–96
Ulster Footballer of the Year: 1996–97
NI Football Writers' Player of the Year: 1996–97

As a manager
Crusaders
NIFL Premiership (3): 2014–15, 2015–16, 2017–18
Irish Cup (3): 2008–09, 2018–19, 2021–22
Setanta Cup (1): 2012
Irish League Cup (1): 2011–12
County Antrim Shield (3): 2009–10, 2017–18, 2018–19
IFA Intermediate League (1): 2005–06
IFA Intermediate League Cup (1): 2005–06
Steel & Sons Cup (1): 2005–06

References 

1965 births
Living people
Ards F.C. players
Bangor F.C. players
Crusaders F.C. players
Glentoran F.C. players
NIFL Premiership players
Linfield F.C. players
Association footballers from Northern Ireland
Ulster Footballers of the Year
Northern Ireland Football Writers' Association Players of the Year
Association footballers from Belfast
People from Newtownards
Crusaders F.C. managers
Association football forwards
Recipients of the British Empire Medal
Lisburn Distillery F.C. players
Glenavon F.C. players
Football managers from Northern Ireland